Crown Holdings, Inc., formerly Crown Cork & Seal Company, is an American company that makes metal beverage and food cans, metal aerosol containers, metal closures and specialty packing. Founded in 1892, it is headquartered in Yardley, Pennsylvania. As of their annual report for 2020, Crown employs 33,264 people at 192 plants in 39 countries. It claims to manufacture one out of every five beverage cans used in the world, and one out of every three food cans used in North America and Europe. The company is ranked No. 286 in the Fortune 500 list for 2022 and is number one in the packaging and container industry for the same list.

History

William Painter, an Irish-born American, invented the crown cap for bottled carbonated beverages in 1891 and obtained patents 468,226 and 468,258 for it on February 2, 1892. He founded his own manufacturing business, the Crown Cork and Seal Company, in Baltimore and set out on a campaign to convince bottlers that his cap was the right one to use on their products. By 1898, he had created a foot-powered crowner device to sell to bottlers and retailers so that they could seal the bottles with his caps quickly and easily. This helped gain acceptance of his bottle caps. By 1906, Crown had opened manufacturing plants in Brazil, France, Germany, Japan, and the United Kingdom.

In 1927, after a merger with New Process Cork Company, Crown Cork and Seal Company was established in New York City. Crown Cork International Corporation was established in the subsequent year to assist subsidiaries engaged in bottle crown and other cork business outside the United States.

By the 1930s, Crown was selling half of the world's supply of bottle caps. Crown entered the tin can business in 1936 with the purchase of the Acme Can Company of Philadelphia, which led to the creation of the Crowntainer, a funnel-shaped beer can, the following year.

To address market changes after World War I and Prohibition, Crown then focused heavily on soft drinks. During World War II, Crown produced war products such as the Kork-N-Seal, the Pour-N-Seal, and the Merit Seal, as well as gas mask canisters. John Connelly took over the presidency of the company and moved the headquarters from Baltimore to Philadelphia in the late 1950s. In 2003, Crown restructured as a public holding company. In 2005 and 2006 Crown exited the plastics industry with the sale of its Global Plastic Closure and its cosmetics packaging businesses.

Regions
 Americas Division: Headquartered in Philadelphia, PA, and serves North, Central and South America, with 46 plants and 5,600 employees which produce aerosol, beverage, food and specialty packaging, as well as metal closures.
 European Division: Headquartered in Zug, Switzerland, and serves Europe, Africa and the Middle East with 71 plants and 11,200 employees which produce aerosol, beverage, food and specialty packaging, as well as metal closures.
 Asia Pacific Division: Headquartered in Singapore, and serves Asia Pacific with 32 plants, 4,300 employees with aerosol, beverage, and food packaging, as well as metalclosures.

Labor practices

In 2015 The Toronto branch of Crown Packaging was in its 21st month of an ongoing labor dispute with 125 United Steelworkers (USW) Local 9176 workers. The workers have alleged that Crown is bargaining in bad faith by offering a 42%, $9 hourly wage cut, and a 5-year pension freeze, among other concessions. The Toronto plant is highly profitable and has received awards for productivity and safety.  USW has filed a complaint with the Ontario Labour Relations, and on 13 March 2015 Ontario labour minister Kevin Flynn announced that mediator Morton Mitchnick had been appointed to conduct an industrial inquiry into the dispute. Crown has been using bused in workers to replace its employees while they strike.
 	
Should the strike be resolved, Crown has stated only 26 of the original workers will continue to have jobs as their positions have since been replaced, a practice known as strikebreaking.

See also 

 Crown cork
 King C. Gillette, was inspired while working as a salesman for Crown Cork and Seal to create a disposable product, the safety razor blade

References

External links

 William Painter, inventor of the Crown Cap

Manufacturing companies based in Philadelphia
American companies established in 1892
Companies listed on the New York Stock Exchange
Packaging companies of the United States
Manufacturing companies established in 1892
1892 establishments in Maryland